Villamantilla is a municipality of the Community of Madrid, Spain. In 2016 it had a population of 1,334.

It is mostly known because at its head is the only Black mayor of Spain, Juan Antonio de la Morena (for the right-wing Partido Popular), born from a Black father and a mother from Equatorial Guinea. He was first elected in 2007 (57.83% for the PP list), and reelected in 2011 (62.64%). His father, uncle and grandfather had already been mayors or vice-mayors of the town, including in Francoist Spain.

References

Municipalities in the Community of Madrid